Portulaca minuta, the tiny purslane, is a species of flowering plant. It grows in the Florida Keys and Bahamas.

References

Flora of Florida
Flora of the Bahamas
minuta
Flora without expected TNC conservation status